The United Conservative Party of Alberta (UCP) is a conservative political party in the province of Alberta, Canada. It was established in July 2017 as a merger between the Progressive Conservative Association of Alberta and the Wildrose Party. When established, the UCP immediately formed the Official Opposition in the Legislative Assembly of Alberta. The UCP won a majority mandate in the 2019 Alberta general election to form the government of Alberta. UCP leader Jason Kenney became premier on April 30, 2019, when he and his first cabinet were appointed and sworn in by the lieutenant governor of Alberta, Lois Mitchell.

A leadership election was triggered after Kenney announced his intention to resign in 2022. It was won by Danielle Smith.

Overview
In July 2017 the Progressive Conservative Association of Alberta and the Wildrose Party merged to form the United Conservative Party under the leadership of Jason Kenney, a former cabinet member in the Stephen Harper government. Kenney had won the 2017 Progressive Conservative Association of Alberta leadership election on a platform of uniting the two parties. The UCP maintained a large lead in opinion polls, from its formation in 2017, during the two years prior to the 2019 provincial election, and at the beginning of 2020. The UCP won the 2019 election with a large majority. 

Under the Premiership of Jason Kenney, their first cabinet of the 30th Alberta Legislature was sworn in by lieutenant governor of Alberta, Lois Mitchell on April 30, 2019.

To maintain their registration and assets, both the PCs and Wildrose ran one paper candidate each in Edmonton-Strathcona (an NDP safe seat held at that time by NDP leader Rachel Notley). On February 7, 2020, after the UCP government passed legislation allowing parties to legally merge, Elections Alberta formally approved the merger of the PCs and Wildrose into the UCP, allowing the UCP to merge the legacy parties' assets and formally wind up their affairs.

Background 
When the Alberta New Democratic Party's (NDP) won the 2015 Alberta general election, it ended an uninterrupted period in which the Progressive Conservative Association of Alberta had won provincial elections since 1971, under Premiers Peter Lougheed, Don Getty, Ralph Klein, Ed Stelmach, Alison Redford, Dave Hancock and Jim Prentice. No other government had served for that long at the provincial or federal level in Canadian history. Until the 1990s, when Preston Manning's anti-establishment right-wing populist Reform Party won 52 seats in the 1993 Canadian federal election and became the Official Opposition in the 1997 Federal Election, there were no significant challenges from the political right to the PCs. Other right-wing parties were established in Alberta, including the Alberta First Party in 1999, the Alberta Independence Party in 2001, the Alberta Alliance Party in 2002, the Wildrose Party of Alberta in 2007, and the Wildrose Alliance Party of Alberta in 2008—the Wildrose Party. 

Following Manning, the Canadian Conservative movement was led by a series of westerners; Stockwell Day from British Columbia, Stephen Harper from Alberta, and Andrew Scheer in Saskatchewan. When Harper was defeated in the 2015 general election by Justin Trudeau, who succeeded him as prime minister, the new leader of the Conservative Party was Andrew Scheer.

By 2016, with the NDP in power at the provincial level in Alberta, and the federal conservative movement weakened under Scheer, the PCs and Wildrose began to discuss a merger to strengthen the right. 

The Wildrose Party had formed in 2008 as a provincial political party in Alberta, Canada with the merger of the Alberta Alliance Party and the unregistered Wildrose Party of Alberta. Its members largely consisted of dissatisfied former Progressive Conservative supporters. Three of the first five Wildrose MLAs were defectors originally elected as Progressive Conservatives.

Danielle Smith, who served as leader of the Wildrose Party from October 2009 until December 2014, made an unsuccessful attempt to merge the Wildrose and the PC party by resigning from the Wildrose and crossing the floor to join the governing Progressive Conservative Association of Alberta caucus under then Premier Jim Prentice, along with eight other Wildrose MLAs. The remaining Wildrose Party refused to consider the request by Smith to dissolve their party. Then Wildrose President David Yager said at the time "This is not a merger in any way. It is capitulation." When the NDP won in 2015 an Edmonton Sun article blamed the mass Wildrose defections for the loss. In the wake of the historical loss, uniting the Wildrose and PC parties became a major issue. In July 2016, federal MP and former minister Jason Kenney announced that he would seek the PC leadership on a platform of seeking a merger with the Wildrose.

At the Wildrose AGM held in Red Deer on October 28, 2016, Brian Jean, then Wildrose Leader of the Opposition, cautioned the caucus against merging just before the 2017 elections; he said the PC party, was "confused about its values" and rife with "instability." 

On December 15, 2016, a rift occurred in the Wildrose party when MLA Derek Fildebrandt openly supported a merger with the PCs. Fildebrandt, who was the first Wildrose MLA to break with Jean, said that Albertans wanted "a single conservative option to face against the NDP in the next election."

When the two parties did merge, following an overwhelming vote in favour of the merger, some Wildrosers declined to join the UCP. A group of the former Wildrose constituency association presidents met in July to discuss forming a new party.

Kenney was elected PC leader on March 18, 2017 on a platform of uniting the two parties—"Uniting the Right". Negotiations between Jean and Kenney were successful; the merger agreement was released on May 18, 2017. The results of the July 22, 2017 internal votes on the merger agreement held by both parties supported the merger with 95% of Wildrose and PC members voting in favour.

The second-place PC leadership candidate and MLA for Vermilion-Lloydminster, Richard Starke, announced on July 24 that he would not join the UCP, and will sit in the legislature as an Independent PC MLA. At least 10 directors of the PC Party resigned after Kenney became leader, with some former Tories working to build a centrist alternative to both the United Conservatives and the NDP before the next provincial election.

A joint meeting of the PC and Wildrose caucuses was held on July 24, 2017, to elect Nathan Cooper, Wildrose MLA for Olds-Didsbury-Three Hills, as interim leader—and hence Leader of the Opposition-- over Prasad Panda, Wildrose MLA for Calgary-Foothills, and Richard Gotfried, PC MLA for Calgary-Fish Creek. As well, members of both caucuses approached the Speaker of the Legislative Assembly of Alberta and ask to be recognized as the United Conservative caucus.

Kenney and Jean selected six individuals each to sit on the interim executive board of the new party. Ed Ammar was elected as first chair of the party on July 24, 2017. Cooper also appointed two MLAs to the board as non-voting members. The new party was registered with Elections Alberta as of July 31, 2017.

Although it was generally understood that the PC and Wildrose merged to form the UCP, Alberta electoral law at the time did not permit parties to formally merge or transfer assets between each other. Thus, the PC and Wildrose legally continued to exist, while the UCP was legally reckoned as a newly created party. As a result, on July 24, 2017–the day the new UCP formally came into existence–Cooper and the UCP's interim leadership team formally assumed the leaderships of both the PC and Wildrose parties as well. Also on that date, all members in good standing of the PCs and Wildrose became members of the UCP, with all but a few members withdrawing their memberships in the merging parties. The PCs and Wildrose withdrew from any meaningful public presence, thus de facto dissolving them although they continued to exist on paper.

Calgary-South East MLA Rick Fraser, a former PC member, left the caucus on September 21, 2017, to sit as an Independent due to his dissatisfaction with the party's leadership contest and the emphasis put by candidates on spending cuts and austerity.

2017 leadership election
The leadership election held on October 28, 2017 resulted in former PC leader Jason Kenney defeating former Wildrose leader Brian Jean and Doug Schweitzer, a former aide to Jim Prentice, to become UCP leader. Kenney won more than 60% of the vote on the first ballot. Kenney successfully contested a by-election in Calgary-Lougheed on December 14, 2017, after incumbent MLA Dave Rodney resigned in order to give Kenney an opportunity to enter the Alberta legislature.

2019 provincial election
The UCP won the 2019 provincial election with a large majority, mainly on the strength of a near-sweep of Calgary (where it won all but three seats) and rural Alberta (where it won all but one seat). 

Under the Premiership of Jason Kenney, their first cabinet of the 30th Alberta Legislature was sworn in by lieutenant governor of Alberta, Lois Mitchell, on April 30, 2019.

Fundraising
The UCP raised $6.6 million in funds in 2018, At the end of 2019, after the successful election, the party had $41.1 million in liabilities and a $2.3 million deficit. During the COVID-19 pandemic in Alberta, the UCP faced funding challenges. The party raised $5 million by the end of 2020. In November 2021, caucus members raised concerns about Kenney's leadership, which is up for review in April 2022—Kenney's poll numbers dropped dramatically and fundraising lagged behind the NDP.

Platform and position 
The UCP has been described by media outlets as centre-right to right-wing.

The party held its founding convention to set its official policies on May 5, 2018.

The UCP adopted an aggressive pro-fossil fuel stance supported by the establishment of what was commonly referred to as the "War Room" backed by a budget of $30 million using a private corporation structure that is not subject to FOIP. The pro-fossil fuel stance is also supported by a strong opposition to green energy transition which they view as an "ideological scheme". The Canadian Energy Centre was launched in December 2019 with an annual budget of CA$30 million. 

The UCP attempted to restructure the Alberta Healthcare system by passing Bill 21, and then using this bill to support tearing up the Master Agreement with the Alberta Medical Association and imposing major fee structure changes.

The UCP under Danielle Smith government passes its Alberta Sovereignty Within a United Canada Act on December 8, 2022.

Controversies

2017 leadership race RCMP investigation
On March 16, 2019, it came to light that during the UCP leadership election campaign Jason Kenney's leadership campaign collaborated with fellow candidate Jeff Callaway's campaign to undermine the leadership campaign of former Wildrose party leader Brian Jean. A document prepared by Callaway's communication's manager describes how Kenney's campaign provided communications support as well as planned regular strategic direction throughout Callaway's campaign. The Alberta Elections Commissioner levied more than $200,000 in fines relating to the kamikaze campaign prior to the Elections Commissioner's termination by the UCP government and conclusion of open investigations.

The 2017 UCP leadership race remains under investigation by the RCMP for alleged use of identity fraud in the voting process. The UCP supports replacing the RCMP with a provincial police force.

Gay–Straight Alliance clubs
The party drew criticism over Kenney's proposal to allow schools to notify parents when their children joined Gay–Straight Alliance clubs. In response, the Notley government drafted and passed Bill 24, which forbade teachers from outing children who were members of the GSAs. The matter once again caused controversy after the UCP Policy Convention in May 2018, when members of the party voted to adopt the policy whereby schools inform parents when their children have joined a GSA. UCP MLAs Ric McIver, Jason Nixon, and Leela Aheer all opposed the policy, and despite urging members to vote against adopting the policy, it was passed with 57% of the vote.

Resolution 17

As part of the October 2022 UCP AGM Policy and Governance resolutions, parts of Resolution 17 take on a transphobic stance, clearly documented in updates to wording and additions. One addition states that parents and caregivers have the right to not recognize their child’s gender identity. Wording included non requirement to affirm or social condition a child’s gender identity that would be incongruent with the birth sex of the child.

Another part of this resolution includes the affirmation of the freedom of religion and conscience rights of parents to ensure government does not interfere in children being taught in areas involving identity, morality, and sexuality.  Identity is formed through many different ways and in endless settings, making it nearly impossible for this to be separated out of teaching and training. The addition of these resolutions place Christian values at the top of a hierarchy, with emphasis that the heterosexual, Eurocentric family unit is what is used for teaching and training in schools.

Factions
Some MLA’s, including Drew Barnes, Donna Kennedy-Glans, and Angela Pitt called for greater autonomy for Alberta. Angela Pitt and sixteen other MLAs denounced Kenney's COVID-19 restrictions in April 2021. Pitt and others joined the "End the Lockdowns" national caucus of elected officials. 

Drew Barnes, who was MLA for Cypress-Medicine Hat and Todd Loewen, formerly UCP MLA for Grande Prairie-Smoky, were expelled from the UCP caucus in May 2021 for "repeatedly speaking out against government decisions." Kenney evicted Leela Aheer, MLA for Chestermere-Rocky View from cabinet in July 2021 after she criticizing the premier for his response to the pandemic during the fourth wave.

At the September 28, 2021 Free Alberta Strategy initiative conference, three MLAs Angela Pitt, Jason Stephan and Nathan Cooper, who is UCP Speaker of the House and head of the UCP caucus, said they no longer had confidence in Kenney as Premier, in response to their growing dissatisfaction the UCP's response to COVID-19. In spite of their criticism, neither Pitt nor Leela Aheer were expelled from caucus.

Leaders

Electoral results

Post-merger caucus (2017–2019 election)

Notes

References

External links
Unity Agreement in Principle -founding document

 
2017 establishments in Alberta
Conservative parties in Canada
Organizations based in Calgary
Provincial political parties in Alberta
Progressive Conservative Association of Alberta
Wildrose Party
Political parties established in 2017
Social conservative parties